Hiradharpur is  a  village in the Chandrakona I CD block in the Ghatal subdivision of the Paschim Medinipur district in the state of West Bengal, India.

Demographics
According to the 2011 Census of India, Hiradharpur had a total population of 2046, of which 1062 (52%) were males and 984 (48%) were females.

Hiradharpur picture gallery

References

External links

Villages in Paschim Medinipur district